Wim de Beer (30 August 1932 – 9 July 2008) was a Dutch field hockey player. He competed in the men's tournament at the 1960 Summer Olympics.

References

External links
 

1932 births
2008 deaths
Dutch male field hockey players
Olympic field hockey players of the Netherlands
Field hockey players at the 1960 Summer Olympics
Sportspeople from Tilburg
20th-century Dutch people